Blayne Wikner (born 15 February 1972) is a South African cyclist. He competed in the men's individual road race at the 1996 Summer Olympics.

References

External links
 

1972 births
Living people
South African male cyclists
Olympic cyclists of South Africa
Cyclists at the 1996 Summer Olympics
Sportspeople from East London, Eastern Cape